Vidadi is an Azerbaijani name that may refer to
Vidadi Babanli (born 1927), Azerbaijani writer, dramatist and translator 
Vidadi Isgandarov, Azerbaijani human rights activist and politician
Vidadi Muradov, Azerbaijani economist
Vidadi Narimanbekov (born 1926), Azerbaijani painter
Vidadi Rzayev (born 1967), Azerbaijani football midfielder 
Molla Vali Vidadi (1708–1809), Azerbaijani poet 

Azerbaijani masculine given names
Azerbaijani-language surnames